Live by the Code is the fifth studio album by American hardcore band Terror. It was released in 2013 via Victory Records.

Track list

Chart positions

References

2013 albums
Terror (band) albums
Victory Records albums